Bury Bridge at Bury in the parish of Brompton Regis within the English county of Somerset is a medieval packhorse bridge. It has been scheduled as an ancient monument and Grade II* listed building.

The stone bridge carries a track over the River Haddeo. Two of the arches are pointed and the other two semi-circular.

References

Scheduled monuments in West Somerset
Grade II* listed buildings in West Somerset
Bridges in Somerset
Grade II* listed bridges in England
Packhorse bridges